Wabar may refer to:

 One of the many names for the lost city in the Arabian peninsula. See Iram of the Pillars.
 The meteorite name and impact site of Wabar craters, found in 1932 during a search for the city of Wabar
 Wabar, the title held by the head of the Degoodi clan of the Somali people